Davaradibi (also, Davaradabi) is a village and municipality in the Lerik Rayon of Azerbaijan.  It has a population of 410.  The municipality consists of the villages of Davaradibi and Qucu.

References 

Populated places in Lerik District